Margam Castle, Margam, Port Talbot, Wales, is a late Georgian country house built for Christopher Rice Mansel Talbot. Designed by Thomas Hopper, the castle was constructed in a Tudor Revival style over a five-year period, from 1830 to 1835. The site had been occupied for some 4,000 years. A Grade I listed building, the castle is now in the care of Neath Port Talbot County Borough Council.

History
The Margam estate was occupied in the Iron Age, and the remains of a hill fort from that period, Mynydd-y-Castell, stand north of the castle. After the Norman Invasion of Wales, Robert, 1st Earl of Gloucester, and Lord of Glamorgan, granted the lands at Margam to Clairvaux Abbey, for the establishment of a new Cistercian monastery which became Margam Abbey. Following the Dissolution of the Monasteries from 1536, the Margam estate was bought by Sir Rice (Rhys) Mansel. His descendants built a substantial Tudor mansion in the park. In the 18th century, this mansion was demolished, and the family returned to one of their earlier ancestral homes, Penrice Castle,  Thomas Mansel Talbot (1747–1813), commissioning Anthony Keck to build a new mansion next to the castle ruins. Keck was also employed at Margan, which Talbot turned into a pleasure garden, using Keck to design an enormous orangery.
 
Christopher Rice Mansel Talbot succeeded his father in 1813 at the age of ten. Enriched by the development of Port Talbot in the early 19th century, and after making a Grand Tour of Europe as a young man, Talbot returned to south Wales and from 1830 re-established Margam as his main seat. A new house, Margam Castle was designed in a Tudor Gothic style by the architect Thomas Hopper (1776–1856), with Edward Haycock Snr (1790–1870) as supervisory architect, and designer of parts of the interior and exterior of the house, the stables, terraces and lodges.

Talbot also took a keen interest in the project, encouraging his architects to borrow elements from Lacock Abbey in Wiltshire (ancestral home of the Talbots and home to his cousin William Henry Fox Talbot) and Melbury House in Dorset (home of his mother's family, the Fox-Strangways, Earls of Ilchester). William Henry Fox Talbot was a frequent visitor to Margam, and the castle featured as an image in some of his early photographic experiments. Margam's links with photography also include being the location of the earliest known Welsh photograph, a daguerreotype of the castle taken on 9 March 1841 by the Reverend Calvert Richard Jones.

After the death of Emily Charlotte Talbot, the daughter of its first owner, the castle passed to her nephew and continued to be used by the Talbot family until 1941, when it was sold. David Evans-Bevan, who bought it, found it too large to live in, but could not find any public organisation interested in taking it on, and it fell into disrepair.  For many years it belonged to the local authority, but was not open to the public. In 1977, a fire caused substantial damage, and it was only after this that a restoration project began in earnest.

Today Margam Castle is in the care of Neath Port Talbot County Borough Council.

Reputed hauntings 
The castle is reputedly haunted. In 2019, paranormal investigators from American television series Paranormal Lockdown visited the castle; the resulting investigations became an episode of the show's third season.

Architecture
Margam Castle is a Grade I listed building. Its service courtyard is listed Grade II*, as are the terrace walls and screen, while the steps in the terraced garden are listed Grade II.

References

Sources

External links
 

Houses completed in 1840
Grade I listed buildings in Neath Port Talbot
Grade I listed houses
Mock castles in Wales
Castles in Neath Port Talbot
Tourist attractions in Neath Port Talbot
Country houses in Wales